Leonard Horne (born 14 September 1878, died after 1925) was a Barbadian cricketer. He played in two first-class match for the Barbados cricket team in 1901/02.

See also
 List of Barbadian representative cricketers

References

External links
 

1878 births
Year of death missing
Barbadian cricketers
Barbados cricketers
People from Wallingford, Oxfordshire
British migrants to British Barbados